Route 24A, or Highway 24A, may refer to:

United States
  Florida State Road 24A
M-24A (Michigan highway) (former)
 Nebraska Link 24A
 New York State Route 24A (former)
 County Route 24A (Livingston County, New York)
 County Route 24A (Oneida County, New York)
 South Dakota Highway 24A
 Utah State Route 24A (former)